Aid is the voluntary transfer of resources from one country to another.

Aid or AID may also refer to:

Assistance and funding
Development aid, financial aid to support the development of developing countries
Humanitarian aid, material and logistic assistance to people who need help
Welfare, social aid to poor people
First aid, assistance given to a person suffering a sudden illness or injury
Charity (practice), voluntary giving of aid and to those in need

People 
 Aid (rapper) (born 1990), stagename of Aida Alonso Iglesias, a Spanish rap singer
 George Charles Aid (1872–1938), American painter
 Matthew Aid (1958–2018), American military historian and author

Science and technology

Biology and medicine
 Activation-induced cytidine deaminase, an enzyme
 Amputee identity disorder, now more commonly known as "body integrity identity disorder", a controversial psychological and neurological mental disorder
 Artificial insemination by donor, a type of human artificial insemination
 Autoimmune disease, a disorder with an overactive immune response of the body

Other uses in science and technology
 Algebraic interpretive dialogue, an implementation of JOSS II for the PDP-10
 Automatic interaction detection, a precursor to, and component of chi-square automatic interaction detection
 Application identifier, in the EMV payment card chip standard

Other uses
 Aid (Würm), a river in Germany
 Aid, Missouri, a community in the US
 Americans for Informed Democracy, an American non-profit organization
 Association for India's Development, an American/Indian non-profit organization

See also

 Feudal aid, feudal taxation
 AIDS, Acquired immunodeficiency syndrome
 USAID, United States Agency for International Development
 Aide (disambiguation)
 AIDS (disambiguation)
 Assistance (disambiguation)
 Eid (disambiguation)
 Help (disambiguation)